Mingo Central Comprehensive High School (also known as Mingo Central High School) is a public high school serving central and southern Mingo County, West Virginia. It is the consolidated result of high schools in Delbarton, Gilbert, Matewan and Williamson. It was designed by Williamson Shriver Architects, Inc. of Charleston. The school opened in August 2011.

MCHS is situated on 90 acres of land donated by Nicewonder Contracting Inc. and Alpha Natural Resources along the King Coal Highway in Newtown. The campus includes the main school complex and the upper athletic facilities, which includes Harless Stadium, a 6,000 seat football stadium. The building encompasses 172,535 square feet and includes a 2,200 seat gymnasium, a 400 seat auditorium with state of the art stage sets, a 480 seat commons area (cafeteria) with flat-screen televisions, an 80 member band room, and an auxiliary gym.

References

External links
 

2011 establishments in West Virginia
Educational institutions established in 2011
Public high schools in West Virginia
Schools in Mingo County, West Virginia